Leslie "Les" Greenall (born 11 April 1944) is an English former professional rugby league footballer who played in the 1960s and 1970s. Les supported St. Helens growing up.

Background
Les Greenall was born in Haydock, Lancashire, England.

Playing career

Challenge Cup Final appearances
Les Greenall played  in St. Helens' 16-13 victory over Leeds in the 1972 Challenge Cup Final during the 1971-72 season at Wembley Stadium, London on Saturday 13 May 1972

Club career
Les Greenall was signed aged 21 in 1965 by Wigan from St. Helens for £750, (based on increases in average earnings, this would be approximately £24,690 in 2013).

Outside of Rugby League
As of 2011, Les Greenall is a warden at St. Mark's Church, Haydock.

References

External links
Search for "Greenall" at rugbyleagueproject.org
Statisctics at wigan.rlfans.com

1944 births
Living people
English rugby league players
People from Haydock
Rochdale Hornets players
Rugby league hookers
Rugby league players from Lancashire
St Helens R.F.C. players
Wigan Warriors players